Ekstasis is the second studio album by the American musician Julia Holter. It was released on March 8, 2012, by RVNG Intl. It was preceded by two singles, "Marienbad" and "In The Same Room". A 12" EP, "Goddess Eyes" - which featured both versions of "Goddess Eyes" from the LP - followed in December 2012, after the album had been issued by Domino in the UK on October 26.

Critical reception

Ekstasis received widespread acclaim from critics. At Metacritic, which assigns a normalized rating out of 100 to reviews from mainstream publications, the album received an average score of 83, based on 18 reviews.

Year-end rankings

Track listing

Charts

References

2012 albums
Julia Holter albums